Atsuki (written: 篤紀, 昌樹 or あつき in hiragana) is a masculine Japanese given name. Notable people with the name include:

, Japanese footballer
, Japanese footballer
, Japanese baseball player
, Japanese voice actor and actor
, Japanese footballer
, Japanese footballer
, Japanese baseball player

Japanese masculine given names